Disney Interactive is an American video game and internet company that oversees various websites and interactive media owned by The Walt Disney Company.

History

1995–1996: Formation and beginnings
In December 1994, Disney announced that it was establishing a new division dedicated to publishing computer and video game console software, called Disney Interactive. The initial staff consisted of 200 newly hired employees. The company was formally established in mid-1995. On August 23, 1995, Disney Interactive formed Disney Online.

1997–2007: Buena Vista Internet Group
Disney purchased a one-third share of Starwave on April 3, 1997, for $100 million. In January 1998, Disney registered go.com. Exercising its options, Disney purchased the outstanding shares of Starwave from Paul Allen in April 1998.  In June 1998, Disney purchased 43% ownership of Infoseek in exchange for Starwave and $70 million.  Infoseek and Disney Online joint ventured in developing the Go Network, an internet portal.  With Disney's purchase of the remainder of Infoseek in July 1999, the Go Network, Infoseek, the Disney Catalog, Disney Online (Disney.com and DisneyStore.com), ABC News Internet Ventures and ESPN Internet Ventures and Buena Vista Internet Group are merged into the Go.com company.

In August 1996, BVIG took a controlling in interest in toysmart.com with three directors on the board. Toysmart would be granted marketing support including free advertising on BVIG websites like family.com. After an attempted round of financing, Toysmart.com shut down in May 2000.

In June 1999, the Disney Internet Guide is abandoned. The Go.com portal was shut down in 2001 at a cost of $878 million in charges.

In 2004, Disney re-activated the Starwave identity as Starwave Mobile, which publishes casual games for mobile phones for non-Disney brands with in Disney conglomerate or from third party. In December 2004 and partnered with Indiagames, the Walt Disney Internet Group released Disney games, wallpapers and ringtones in the Indian market which is also available on AirTel.

The group further expanded through purchase of Living Mobile, a European mobile game developer and publisher in November 2005 and Enorbus Technologies in 2007.

2008–2012: Disney Interactive Media Group
On June 5, 2008, Disney Interactive Studios and the Walt Disney Internet Group merged into a single business unit, now known as the Disney Interactive Media Group. In 2009, DIMG's Disney Online unit purchased multiple websites from Kaboose.

In July 2010, Disney Interactive purchased Playdom for $563.2 million and Tapulous for its Mobile division. On July 1, Disney Interactive announced it had acquired Tapulous, the studio behind the Tap Tap Revenge franchise for iOS. In October, two co-presidents were named for DIMG, John Pleasants and James Pitaro, with orders to make the company profitable.

In January 2011, DIMG closed its Propaganda Games game studio and laid off 200 employees later in the month. The dual presidents placed the game studios of Blackrock, Junction Point, Avalanche, Wideload and Gamestar under its new game development chief Alex Seropian while Penguin creator Lane Merrifield was assigned to game initiatives for kids and families within a new publishing unit to handle marketing and production. On February 18, DIMG purchased Togetherville, a pre-teen social network. Also in February, Disney purchased Finland-based Rocket Pack, a game development company with a plugin free game development system. In November, DIMG purchased Babble Media Inc.

In April 2012, the Group announced three web series targeted towards mothers: "Moms of", "That's Fresh", and "Thinking Up."  By October, DIMG had 15 consecutive quarters of losses totaling some $977 million. Lane Merrifield, the founder of Club Penguin, resigned after conflict with Pleasants. DIMG also in October announced "Toy Box", a cross platform gaming initiative where Pixar and Disney characters will interact from a console game to multiple mobile and online applications.

2012–2018: Disney Interactive
Around May–July 2012, Disney Interactive Media Group changed its name to Disney Interactive (DI).

In January 2013, Disney Interactive Games' Avalanche Software unveiled the Toy Box cross platform game as Disney Infinity, based on Toy Story 3: The Video Game'''s "Toy Box" mode crossed with a toy line. Also in January, Disney Interactive announced the closure of Junction Point Studios.

In October 2013, Disney announced that its Interactive division had a profit of $16 million for its fourth quarter, based partly on sales of Disney Infinity and uniting both halves of the division under one president.

In March 2014, Disney Interactive announced it was laying off 700 people, or one-fourth of its staff as DI combines its two-game units, mobile and social, due to sagging popularity of Facebook games, and closing some Disney Online sites. They said will focus less on advertising and more on sponsorships for Disney Online and licensed game development. While some endeavors have shown profitability, such as an app in Japan and the combined game and toy line Infinity, the segment as a whole is unprofitable for Disney.

Disney Interactive was merged with Disney Consumer Products on June 29, 2015, forming a new segment and division known as "Disney Consumer Products and Interactive Media", with Disney Interactive as a direct unit. In December 2015, Maker Studios was placed under the control of Disney Interactive with the appointment of Maker's executive vice president Courtney Holt, reporting to Jimmy Pitaro, president of Disney Interactive.

With a lack of growth in toy-to-game market and increasing developmental costs, in May 2016, Disney Interactive discontinued Disney Infinity and closed down the unit that developed Infinity, Avalanche Software. Also, the company ended all self-publishing efforts. A discontinuation charge of $147 million for ending its console gaming business affected earning.

In September 2018, Disney confirmed the imminent discontinuation of Club Penguin Island in a letter sent to its Disney Online Studios team in Kelowna, as well as the layoffs of most employees in said studio.

In November 2018, Disney agreed to have Jam City take over operation of its Glendale-based Disney Interactive Studios, sell them Emoji Blitz and development of future Pixar and Walt Disney Animation franchises games. Staff at the studio would be offered jobs with Jam City working on the Disney titles.

 2018-present 
Disney Interactive would take over publishing duties of various Disney-branded video games not licensed to other companies. Their first release was Disney Classic Games: Aladdin and The Lion King on October 29, 2019 for Microsoft Windows, Nintendo Switch, PlayStation 4 and Xbox One, a collection of tie-in video games based on both films developed by Digital Eclipse; a re-release featuring The Jungle Book games and the SNES version of Aladdin, named Disney Classic Games Collection was released on November 23, 2021.

Disney would also release Zombies Ate My Neighbors and Ghoul Patrol for the above platforms in June 29, 2021. Their first release that isn’t a port of old games will be Disney Illusion Island'', which is a platform game developed by Dlala Studios and featuring Mickey Mouse; it will be released exclusively for Nintendo Switch in July 28, 2023.

Units
Rocket Pack
Studio Ex
Gamestar
Disney Online Studios
Disney Online
Disney Mobile
Disney Digital Network (formerly Maker Studios), multi-network content for YouTube.

Disney Online

Disney Online is a division of Disney Interactive that operates most of Disney online portfolio.

On August 23, 1995, Disney Interactive formed Disney Online unit with the naming of Jake Winebaum as president of Disney Online. On November 19, 1996, the opening of DisneyStore.com was open under Disney Online business unit.  The family.com website is launched on December 9, 1996.

Disney announced on April 18, 1997 that it will purchase Starwave's Family Planet Web site and merge it with Family.com.  The Disney Daily Blast (dailyblast.com) web site is official launched on April 23 under a subscription plan and daily content targeted to younger viewers with Microsoft Network marketing and distributing for an exclusive 10-month period.

In July 1998, Disney Online announced dig.com, Disney Internet Guide, a child friendly web directory which launched in June 1998 and closed one year later in June to focus on Infoseek/Go Network.

In late 2007, DIMG purchased IParenting Media's websites. Disney sold movies.com to Fandango in June 2008. Disney Online purchased in 2008 Take 180 from Chris Williams, who stays on until April 2012 as vice president and general manager of Disney Online Originals, which has Take 180 as creative hub. In 2009, DIMG's Disney Online unit purchased from Kaboose multiple websites including: Kaboose.com, Babyzone.com, AmazingMoms.com, Funschool.com and Zeeks.com, and place them into its Disney Family Network. Disney.com purchased Kerpoof in February 2009.

In November 2011, DIMG purchased Babble Media Inc. to add it to the Mom and Family Portfolio. In March 2014, Disney Interactive announced it was laying off 700 people, or one-fourth of its staff as DI closed smaller Disney Online sites including BabyZone.com and Spoonful.com. They said will focus less on advertising and more on sponsorships for Disney Online to fit the experience Disney wishes to offer.

Online units
disney.com
Disney Family Network websites - also called Mom and Family Portfolio
Family.Disney.com
Babble.com, mother bloggers site
DigiSynd, social media marketing

References

External links

Disney.com
Disney Family Network websites
Babble.com
Spoonful.com
Babyzone.com

 
Disney video games
Online mass media companies of the United States
Software companies of the United States
Entertainment companies based in California
Software companies based in California
Video game companies based in California
Video game publishers
Video game development companies
Technology companies based in Greater Los Angeles
Companies based in Glendale, California
American companies established in 1995
Entertainment companies established in 1995
Mass media companies established in 1995
Internet properties established in 1995
Software companies established in 1995
Video game companies established in 1995
1995 establishments in California